Matija Kristić (born 10 October 1978) is a Croatian football manager and former football defender who currently manages Polet Sveti Martin na Muri.

Club career
Kristić had spells in the Polish, Russian and Slovene top flights as well as one with Austrian third tier-side SV Neuberg.

References

External links
 
PrvaLiga profile 
Matija Kristić profile at Nogometni Magazin 

1978 births
Living people
Sportspeople from Varaždin
Association football defenders
Croatian footballers
NK Varaždin players
Zagłębie Lubin players
NK Slaven Belupo players
FC Luch Vladivostok players
NK Zelina players
NK Zavrč players
Croatian Football League players
Ekstraklasa players
Russian Premier League players
Austrian Regionalliga players
Slovenian PrvaLiga players
Croatian expatriate footballers
Expatriate footballers in Poland
Croatian expatriate sportspeople in Poland
Expatriate footballers in Russia
Croatian expatriate sportspeople in Russia
Expatriate footballers in Austria
Croatian expatriate sportspeople in Austria
Expatriate footballers in Slovenia
Croatian expatriate sportspeople in Slovenia